Irene Dailey (September 12, 1920 – September 24, 2008) was an American stage, film, and television actress.

Biography
Dailey was born in New York City, the daughter of Helen Theresa (née Ryan) and Daniel James Dailey. Her brother was actor Dan Dailey.

Dailey received the 1966 Drama Desk Award for her work in Rooms, and played Nettie Cleary in the original Broadway production of the Tony Award-winning drama, The Subject Was Roses (1964). Other Broadway credits included Idiot's Delight, The Good Woman of Szechwan, and You Know I Can't Hear You When the Water's Running.

In 1969, Dailey joined the cast of the long-running CBS serial The Edge of Night as Pamela Stewart, the vindictive wife of Nicole Drake's ex-husband Duane who stabbed Stephanie Martin to death. In 1971 she won the Sarah Siddons Award for her work in Chicago theatre. Dailey later joined the cast of Another World in 1974 as the fourth actress to play the role of family matriarch Liz Matthews. While other members of the Matthews family were written out in the early 1980s, she remained a major character on the show until the summer of 1986, returning in November 1987 on a non-contract basis, being prominently featured in the show's 25th and 30th anniversary shows, and making her last appearance in May 1994.

Her work on Another World was recognized with a Daytime Emmy Award for Outstanding Actress in 1979; two of her fellow nominees were her AW costars Victoria Wyndham and Beverlee McKinsey. The meddling "Aunt Liz" was first a rival with Rachel for the love of Mac Cory, and later became his secretary. As Liz mellowed, Dailey was allowed to show her flair for comedy, but as the Matthews family dwindled onscreen, she became a sounding board for various friends and family and a well-meaning busy-body. After the death of Liz's great niece Sally, Dailey was written out, but the following year was brought back due to popular demand. The Matthews family had a brief resurgence, and Liz became a confidante for her great niece Olivia. After that storyline ended, Liz continued to appear at special events, most notably at Ada Hobson's memorial and at a Cory Publishing gathering which coincided with the show's 30th anniversary. After her final appearance in 1994, she appeared on Broadway in a revival of the Strindberg play The Father, receiving excellent notices for her performance as Frank Langella's nurse who must manipulate him into a straitjacket after he goes insane. Her film credits include No Way to Treat a Lady (1968), Five Easy Pieces (1970) and The Amityville Horror (1979).

According to Dailey, she was a self-described lifelong Democrat and a practicing Catholic. She never married nor had any children with the reason being that she simply never had a desire to become those things.   

Dailey died on September 24, 2008 of colon cancer at a healthcare facility in Santa Rosa, California, according to Arleen Lorrance, a longtime friend. She had been a resident of Guerneville.

Filmography

Film

Television

Selected discography
 1965: Of Poetry and Power: Poems Occasioned by the Presidency and by the Death of John F. Kennedy (Folkways Records)
 1967: The Wick and the Tallow By Henry Gilfond (Folkways Records)

Further reading

References

External links
 
 
 
 Dailey Discography at Smithsonian Folkways

1920 births
2008 deaths
Deaths from cancer in California
Deaths from colorectal cancer
20th-century American actresses
Actresses from New York (state)
American stage actresses
American film actresses
American television actresses
American soap opera actresses
Daytime Emmy Award winners
Daytime Emmy Award for Outstanding Lead Actress in a Drama Series winners
21st-century American women
American Roman Catholics
New York (state) Democrats
California Democrats